Joseph M. Rigoli (born December 14, 1956 at New York City) is an American professional baseball scout, and a former coach in the Major Leagues for the Philadelphia Phillies.  A longtime scout for the St. Louis Cardinals, he is a member of the Professional Baseball Scouts Hall of Fame.

Rigoli's playing career was brief. After appearing in only two games for the 1978 Bend Timber Hawks of the Short Season-A Northwest League, an affiliate of the Oakland Athletics, he played in 29 games the following season for the 1979 Newark Co-Pilots, a co-op (unaffiliated) club in the Short Season-A New York–Penn League, collecting 14 hits in 61 at bats (.230) in a utility role, playing catcher, outfielder and second base.  He first joined the Cardinals in 1981 as a minor league manager at the Class A level Gastonia Cardinals.  In 1984, while piloting the Springfield Cardinals of the Midwest League, he filled in as a pitcher on four occasions, compiling a 6.43 earned run average in seven innings pitched.

After scouting for the Cardinals during the late 1980s through the mid-1990s, he joined the Phillies in 1996 as bullpen coach, working on the staff of manager Jim Fregosi.  He spent 1997 in the same role under new skipper Terry Francona but in 1998 returned to the Redbirds as a minor-league coach.  In  he was listed as a member of the Cardinals' professional scouting staff, based in Parsippany, New Jersey.

References

External links

Coach's page from Retrosheet

1956 births
Living people
Baseball coaches from New York (state)
Baseball players from New York (state)
Bend Timber Hawks players
Major League Baseball bullpen coaches
Major League Baseball scouts
Minor league baseball managers
Newark Co-Pilots players
People from Parsippany-Troy Hills, New Jersey
Philadelphia Phillies coaches
St. Louis Cardinals scouts
Springfield Cardinals players
Gastonia Cardinals players